Abubarkar Tafawa Balewa Stadium is a multi-use stadium in Bauchi, Nigeria. It is currently used mostly for football matches and is the home stadium of the Wikki Tourists.  The stadium has a capacity of 11,000 and was opened in 1985 and named after Nigeria's first prime minister, Tafawa Balewa.

Abubarkar Tafawa Balewa Stadium was one of the 8 venues used for the 2009 FIFA U-17 World Cup held in Nigeria, hosting 3 matches. Its first game at the tournament between Nigeria and Argentina at the group stage recorded an attendance of 11,467 people.

Distinguishing features of the stadium include the world-class FIFA standard scoreboard, LED display and energy saving floodlights, electronic scoreboard, Close-Circuit Television (CCTV) for security surveillance, and an ultra-modern media centre. It also houses an Olympic-size 10-lane swimming pool.

Notable matches

1999 FIFA World Youth Championship

2009 FIFA U-17 World Cup

References

Football venues in Nigeria